Corporate Rescue and Insolvency is a bi-monthly English-language journal with commentary and analysis on domestic and international insolvency and restructuring law.

The editorial board is made up of practising and academic lawyers and is supported by a panel of contributing law, accountancy firms and organisations providing content.

Features
The journal includes features and articles on technical and practical issues; and an international features section.
Authors on the "In Practice" team include solicitors at Freshfields, Eversheds, Norton Rose, Dickinson Dees, and features by KPMG.

The international features section has contributors from Slaughter and May, Denton Wilde Sapte, Lovells, and Begbies Traynor.

Regular sections also include:

 Turnaround section with features from the Institute for Turnaround (IFT) and R3;
 Legislative update section provided by Ashurst;
 Market spotlight section with a summary of developments in the restructuring and insolvency sector;
 Sector focus section with views and opinions on insolvency and restructuring topics from other sectors; and
 Case coverage supplied by CMS Cameron McKenna in Case Reporter and a summary of recent cases by 11 Stone Buildings in Cases Alerter.

History
The journal was originally published under the title of Tolley's Insolvency Law & Practice (ILP) by Frank Cass & Co in January/February 1985. In 1991, the journal was sold to Tolley and through a series of mergers it became part of LexisNexis in 2003. LexisNexis is owned by Reed Elsevier.

Carolyn Swain was appointed editor in May 2007. The journal was relaunched in January 2008, under the title of Corporate Rescue and Insolvency.

See also
 Construction Law Journal
 Counsel
 Justice of the Peace Magazine
 Justice of the Peace Reports
 New Law Journal
 Tolley's Employment Law Newsletter

British law journals
LexisNexis academic journals